The Koum Formation is a geological formation in the North Province of Cameroon, western Africa.

Its strata date back to the Aptian and Albian stages of the Early Cretaceous. Dinosaur remains are among the fossils that have been recovered from the formation.

Vertebrate paleofauna 
The following fossils have been found in the formation:
Baryonychinae indet.
 Theropod indet.
 Theropod tracks
 Sauropod indet. 
 Sauropod tracks 
 ?Thyreophora indet. 
 Ouranosaurus sp. 
 Euornithopod tracks
 Araripesuchus sp.
 Abelodon abeli

See also 
 List of dinosaur-bearing rock formations

References

Bibliography

Further reading 
 J. D. Congleton. 1990. Vertebrate Paleontology of the Koum Basin, Northern Cameroon, and Archosaurian Paleobiogeography in the Early Cretaceous. Department of Geology, Southern Methodist University, Dallas xv-245
 L. J. Flynn and M. Brunet. 1989. Early Cretaceous vertebrates from Cameroon. Journal of Vertebrate Paleontology 9(3, suppl.):21A

Geologic formations of Cameroon
Lower Cretaceous Series of Africa
Cretaceous Cameroon
Aptian Stage
Albian Stage
Sandstone formations
Mudstone formations
Fluvial deposits
Ichnofossiliferous formations
Paleontology in Cameroon
Formations